Crusoe Kuningbal or Guningbal (1922–1984) was an Aboriginal Australian artist from Maningrida in the Northern Territory, known for a pointillist technique and tall, slim sculptures of mimih spirits. In addition to his art, Kuningbal was a prominent cultural figure in his region, as he sang and performed in important ceremonies, most notably that of the Mamurrng.

Biography 
Crusoe Kuningbal was born in the middle Liverpool River region in the Northern Territory of Australia as part of the Kuninjku language group. He married Lena Kuriniya and had three sons, Crusoe Kurddal, Owen Yalandja, and Timothy Wulandjbirr.

In his early days, he worked at buffalo shooter camps in West Arnhem Land. Prior to World War II, Kuningbal and other members of the Kuninjku moved to Milingimbi mission. It is likely that he gained inspiration for his art from his time in Milingimbi and later Maningrida. After the war, he returned to Maningrida and began to make bark paintings to sell at the local trading post. He became quite renowned as a bark painter with works being acquired by important collections such as the New Gallery of Victoria and the National Gallery of Australia. Most of his bark paintings portray mimih spirits formed by black and white dots. They typically have a solid background, either brown or red. The small dots align to create stripes that form the bodies of the figures.

Later, Kuningbal relocated to Barrihdjowkkeng, a small outstation where he lived with his wife Lena Kuriniya and sons Crusoe Kurddal, Owen Yalandja, and Timothy Wulandjbirr, all of whom were artists. This outstation was closer to ancestral country, which allowed them to become more in touch with the land that is the essence of their beliefs and art. Kuningbal had a significant role in the community as a singer, dancer, and storyteller. He began creating mimih figures in the 1960s for the use in ceremonies, particularly the Mamurrng ceremony. In the mid-1960s, Louis Allen became the first Westerner to purchase one of Kuningbal's mimih carvings. After this, the figures began to grow in popularity. In 1984 (the year of Kuningbal's death), the National Gallery of Australia acquired some of his mimih figures. This was a huge milestone for his works, and they continued to spread to many other collections and exhibitions. He passed down his artistic skills and techniques to his sons, Crusoe Kurddal and Owen Yalandja. Lena Kuriniya, his wife, was also a successful artist, and her works were featured in some of the same exhibitions as her husband's. In 1999, Lena was the top-earning Kuninjku sculptor.

Mamurrng 
The Mamurrng is a ceremony in which two different language communities come together for trade and diplomacy. In this ceremony there are songs, dances, beating of clapsticks, and playing of the didjeridu. Red and white ochre is used to paint the bodies of participants and special outfits of cloth and headbands are dawned. In the 1960s, Kuningbal pioneered many songs and dances used in the ceremony. These dances were inspired by the mimih spirits and their cunning ways. In addition to singing and dancing, Kunginbal carved mimih sculptures for the ceremony which had previously never been done. They were put in the middle to be danced around. He also broke tradition by covering his statues in his now trademark dots instead of traditional rarrk designs. This ceremony was performed in public spaces in Maningrida where community members and outsiders noticed Kuningbal's sculptures and a market demand for them resulted.

Works 
Crusoe Kuningbal was a dancer, singer, painter and carver. He is known for creating ceremonial dance and songs as well as bark paintings of spirits. His bark paintings did not do well in the market, so not many were produced. He is best known for his carved sculptures of mimih spirits. His sculptures are each titled Mimih Spirit. They stand at a range of heights including, 184.5 cm, 114 cm, and 156 cm, with varying diameters to their cylindrical bodies such as 16.5 cm, 12 cm, and 14 cm. The size depends on the single piece of wood that is used to carve the figures. Kuningbal only used Brachychiton diversifolius trees, more commonly known as northern kurrajong. Artists from the Kuninjku/Kunibeidji language cluster continue to use this tree species for their carvings.  His earliest sculptures of mimih were smaller and less detailed than the later and more notable pieces; they were no taller than 1m, and the arms were depicted with grooves. Later pieces made follow a general pattern and aesthetic. The tree is harvested and carved to have two thin and short legs at the base. The torso is carved to be long, thin, and sometimes curved according to the natural growth of the tree it once was. The arms are carved at the base of the head out of and along the length of the torso. The head is then carved to be cylindrical with a sometimes slight conical shape. Using natural pigments, large black circles are painted for eyes with a line of black below for a mouth. Dots in other natural pigment colours are then painted in flowing lines on the figure down the face, the arms, most plentifully on the torso, and partially down the legs. These sculptures are left unsigned. His sculptures were relatively smaller and less detailed than the ones his two sons, Owen and Crusoe, would go on to create after his death.

Career 
Crusoe Kunigbal began as an artist through bark painting as well as in ceremonial song and dance. In the 1960s Kuningbal began to create carved statues. Kuningbal started the tradition of carving in his region. Crusoe Kuningbal primarily focused his artwork on portraying the mimih. Mimih spirits are tall, thin, fragile spirit beings that inhabit Arnhem Land, specifically rocky areas and act in mischievous ways. In the beginning of his career as a sculptor of mimih spirits in the 1980s, they sold from $12-$50. Kuningbal went on to produce his mimih spirit sculptures for sale at the Maningrida Art Center in the Northern Territory of Australia. Peter Cooke, while he was the arts advisor in Maningrida, had a large influence in the marketing of Kunigbal's works. Kuningbal was successful in his local market, but his sons were the ones to bring sculptures of mimih to a larger and cross-cultural market. Many museums and galleries would later collect many of his pieces, as well as his sons'.

Kuningbal was an innovator, and he frequently added new elements to traditional art practices of the region. He was the first person in his clan to create life-size carvings of the mimih. Additionally, he strayed away from the rarrk designs that are typical of his region. Rarrk is a pattern of crosshatching meant to create a shimmer effect that is common in aboriginal art. Instead, he covered the mimih sculptures with small dots. These small and plentiful dots became his trademark. He would later pass this style and techniques onto his sons Crusoe Kurddal and Owen Yalandja. They would both go on to become notable artists themselves through the production of the life-size mimih carvings covered in dots. Kuningbal's sons innovated on the mimih sculptures even more so by making them bigger, more detailed, and with smaller and more plentiful dots. They also branched out to include painted backgrounds and sculpting of other cultural and ancestral figures. There are dozens of people in Maningrida who took up carving mimih sculptures after Kuningbal passed, including some women who are historically excluded from art practices in the region.

His work is included in the Aboriginal and Torres Strait Islander Affairs Art (ATSIAA) Collection at the National Museum Australia. This collection holds 2,050 works spanning a 38 year period following a 1967 referendum that dramatically changed the governance in regards to Aboriginal Australians. The ATSIAA collection stands as a visual history of the diversity and development that took place in Aboriginal Art during this shift in governance. In 1983, Elwyn Lynn commissioned Kuningbal to create a mimih figure spirit for the J.W. Power Collection of contemporary art at the University of Sydney and the Museum of Contemporary Art Australia. This would be the first work of Aboriginal Australian art to enter the Power Collection.

Collections 

Art Gallery of New South Wales
National Gallery of Victoria
J.W. Power Collection at the Museum of Contemporary Art, Sydney
National Gallery of Australia
Aboriginal and Torres Strait Islander Affairs Art Collection at the National Museum Australia
Art Gallery of South Australia

Significant exhibitions 

 1993-4: Aratjara: Art of the First Australians. Europe, 1993-1994. Kunstsammlung Nordrhein-Westfalen, Dusseldorf, Germany; Hayward Gallery, London, England; and the Louisiana Museum of Modern Art, Humlebæk, Denmark.
 2004: Crossing Country: The Alchemy of Western Arnhem Land Art. Art Gallery of New South Wales, Sydney, 25 September - 12 December 2004.
2012-2013: In the Red; On the Vibrancy of Things. UQ Anthropology Museum, Queensland, June 2012 - January 2013.
2018: Outstation. Outstation Gallery and Maningrida Arts & Culture, Maningrida, 4–29 May 2018.

References

External links 

 https://www.ngv.vic.gov.au/explore/collection/artist/113/
 https://www.artgallery.nsw.gov.au/collection/works/80.1985/?
 https://www.artgallery.nsw.gov.au/collection/works/96.2002/
http://www.artgallery.nsw.gov.au/sub/crossingcountry/2_EXHIBITION/exh_highlights3.html
https://nga.gov.au/exhibition/niat07/default.cfm?MnuID=2&GalID=29841
https://news.aboriginalartdirectory.com/2014/05/monstrous-figures-in-arnhem-land.php
http://collectionsearch.nma.gov.au/set/2090?object=145850
https://issuu.com/harveyartprojects.com/docs/maningrida19

1922 births
1984 deaths
20th-century Australian artists
Indigenous Australian artists
Artists from the Northern Territory